An outdoor bronze sculpture of the poet Robert Burns by Hungarian-American artist Ferenc Varga is installed in Hermann Park's McGovern Centennial Gardens in Houston, Texas, United States. The bust was placed in Hermann Park in 2002.

See also
 List of public art in Houston

References

Bronze sculptures in Texas
Busts in Texas
Busts of writers
Cultural depictions of Robert Burns
Hermann Park
Monuments and memorials in Texas
Outdoor sculptures in Houston
Sculptures of men in Texas